Rhostryfan is a place 4 miles from Caernarfon, in the community of Llanwnda, in the principal area of Gwynedd, Wales. In 2020 it had an estimated population of 722. It was formerly served by Rhostryfan railway station.

History 
The "Rhos" part of the name means "a moor", the "tryfan" part means "high place".

References

External links

 

Villages in Gwynedd
Llanwnda, Gwynedd